Adamas Solomonovich Golodets (28 March 1933 in Moscow – 7 April 2006 in Moscow) was a Soviet football player and manager of Jewish ethnicity, who played forward for Neftchi Baku PFC, FC Dynamo Moscow, and FC Dynamo Kiev between 1954 and 1964.  He later was a manager for Dynamo Moscow as well from 1995–98.  He was classified as a Master of Sport of the USSR in 1959.

Personal life
His niece Olga Golodets is an economist who serves as a Deputy Prime Minister of Russia.

References

External links
 

1933 births
Footballers from Moscow
2006 deaths
Soviet Top League players
FC Dynamo Moscow players
FC Dynamo Kyiv players
Neftçi PFK players
Honoured Masters of Sport of the USSR
Soviet footballers
Soviet football managers
Russian football managers
FC Dynamo Moscow managers
Russian Premier League managers
Jewish footballers
Honoured Coaches of Russia
Soviet Jews
Russian Jews
Association football forwards